Salyan is a village development committee in Baglung District in the Dhaulagiri Zone of central Nepal. At the time of the 1991 Nepal census it had a population of 1,935 and had 396 houses in the village.

References

Populated places in Baglung District